The FIS Freestyle World Ski Championships is the world championship organized by the FIS for freestyle skiing. It was first organized in 1986 and is now held every odd year. Currently, the disciplines included in the World Championships are Aerials, Moguls, Dual Moguls, Ski cross, Half-pipe, Slopestyle and Big air. Formerly, Acroski and a combined event were held.

Editions

* Starting from 2015, it combined with the FIS Snowboard World Championships.
** Only snowboarding events.

Current events

Men's events
Bold numbers in brackets denotes record number of victories in corresponding disciplines.

Aerials

Medal table

Moguls

Medal table

Dual moguls

Medal table

Ski cross

Medal table

Half-pipe

Medal table

Slopestyle

Medal table

Big air

Medal table

Women's events
Bold numbers in brackets denotes record number of victories in corresponding disciplines.

Aerials

Medal table

Moguls

Medal table

Dual moguls

Medal table

Ski cross

Medal table

Half-pipe

Medal table

Slopestyle

Medal table

Big air

Medal table

Mixed events
Bold numbers in brackets denotes record number of victories in corresponding disciplines.

Team aerials

Medal table

Team ski cross

Medal table

Discontinued events

Men's events
Bold numbers in brackets denotes record number of victories in corresponding disciplines.

Acroski

Medal table

Combined

Medal table

Women's events
Bold numbers in brackets denotes record number of victories in corresponding disciplines.

Acroski

Medal table

Combined

Medal table

Medal table
Table updated after the 2023 Championships.

Multiple medalists
Boldface denotes active freestyle skiers and highest medal count among all freestyle skiers (including these who not included in these tables) per type.

Men

Women

See also
 FIS Freestyle Ski World Cup
 Freestyle skiing at the Winter Olympics
 List of Olympic medalists in freestyle skiing
 FIS Freestyle Junior World Ski Championships

References

FIS-ski.com listing of the Freestyle and Snowboarding World championships. Accessed 5 December 2010.

External links
fisfreestyle.com FIS Freestyle News, Calendar, Rules and Results
wiki.fis-ski.com – The resource of information and knowledge on Freestyle Skiing, Ski Jumping, FIS World Ski Championships, FIS Leaders Seminar, FIS Ladies Seminar

 
World Championships
Freestyle
International Ski Federation competitions